The Teapot Dome Service Station is a former gas station built in the shape of a teapot located in Zillah, Washington, United States, that is listed on the National Register of Historic Places.

Description
Located at 117 First Avenue, the station is an example of novelty architecture. It was intended as a reminder of the Teapot Dome Scandal that rocked the presidency of Warren G. Harding and sent Interior Secretary Albert Fall to prison for his role in leasing government oil reserves in, among other places, Teapot Dome, Wyoming.

History

The station was built in 1922 on what later became U.S. Route 12. The building has a circular frame with a conical roof, sheet metal "handle", and a concrete "spout". Many such novelties were constructed as roadside attractions as the national highway system in the United States expanded during the 1920s and 1930s. The unique service station continued operation as a full-service gas station for some years. When Interstate 82 was constructed near Zillah in 1978 the station was relocated less than a mile down the Yakima Valley Highway. After the gas station was closed in 2006, it was purchased by the city the following year, rehabilitated, and relocated in 2012 to 117 First Avenue. It now serves as Zillah's visitors center.

See also

 National Register of Historic Places listings in Yakima County, Washington
 Airplane Service Station, 1930 station built in the shape of an airplane, Tennessee
 Chester teapot
 Shell Service Station, 1930 station built in the shape of a scallop shell, North Carolina

References

External links

 Teapot information – City of Zillah
  “Roadside Attractions”, a National Park Service Teaching with Historic Places (TwHP) lesson plan

Retail buildings in Washington (state)
Infrastructure completed in 1922
Novelty buildings in Washington (state)
Buildings and structures in Yakima County, Washington
Gas stations on the National Register of Historic Places in Washington (state)
Roadside attractions in Washington (state)
Tourist attractions in Yakima County, Washington
Teapot Dome scandal
Teapots
National Register of Historic Places in Yakima County, Washington
1922 establishments in Washington (state)